Events from the year 1456 in France

Incumbents
 Monarch – Charles VII

Events
 7 July - A Retrial of Joan of Arc overturns her original conviction

Deaths
 17 January - Elisabeth of Lorraine-Vaudémont, writer (born 1395)
 17 October - Nicolas Grenon, composer (born 1375)
 4 December - Charles I, Duke of Bourbon, nobleman (born 1401)

References

1450s in France